Thodi Si Zameen Thoda Sa Aasmaan (English: A Little bit of Land A Little bit of Sky) is an Indian television show broadcast on STAR Plus. The series was produced by Smriti Irani along with Ekta Kapoor. It aired during weekends from 19 August 2006 to 2 September 2007.

Plot 
The show is based on the story of the mill workers, who have lost their job as the company (mill) has shut down. Uma (Smriti Irani) has to work hard to run her family as her father and brother have lost their job.

Thus, Uma tries to motivate the people of her 'basti' to work hard to conform various roles in the running of a mall, so they can all have jobs to run their families. Besides being a hard worker, Uma goes to school to fulfill her dreams even though that is not her parents’ priority.

Cast 
Smriti Irani as Uma Apte
 Usha Nadkarni as Girija 
Pawan Shankar as Sanjay Apte
Jaya Bhattacharya as Pooja 
Sanjeet Bedi as Munna
Kiran Karmarkar as Sudhanshu 
Harsh Chhaya as  Dushyant Jajodia
 Madhavi Chopra as Sapna 
Sachin Tyagi as  Prashant 
Shweta Salve as Malvica Chopra
Shraddha Nigam

Production
The series was produced by Smriti Irani with her own new production house Ugraya Entertainment partnering and co produced with Ekta Kapoor's Balaji Telefilms, based on the real life incidents and set in Mumbai Chawl. When the contract between them got over after 52 episodes, Kapoor and Balaji Telefilms moved out of the production of the series in February 2007.

This is the first series produced by Smriti Irani and also the first one in which Balaji Telefilms were co-producers.

On 4 November 2006, main lead Irani playing Uma could not be able to shoot for the series as she suffered from dengue and typhoid and was admitted in hospital. However, with the bank episodes available, the series was managed without her and she returned to shoot back after a week.

The series initially had an average ratings but on progressing it dropped which made the channel to end the series in September 2007.

Reception
Business Standard stated, "The dialogues and their delivery are suited to the way the language is spoken in such places. And though the characters portray emotions, they do so within realistic parametres."

References

External links
Official Site on STAR Plus

Balaji Telefilms television series
Indian television soap operas
StarPlus original programming
2006 Indian television series debuts
2007 Indian television series endings